The 2016 Coleman Vision Tennis Championships was a professional tennis tournament played on outdoor hard courts. It was the 19th edition of the tournament and part of the 2016 ITF Women's Circuit, offering a total of $75,000 in prize money. It took place in Albuquerque, United States, on 19–25 September 2016.

Singles main draw entrants

Seeds 

 1 Rankings as of 12 September 2016.

Other entrants 
The following player received a wildcard into the singles main draw:
  Usue Maitane Arconada
  Nicole Frenkel
  Chanelle Van Nguyen
  Aleksandra Wozniak

The following players received entry from the qualifying draw:
  Marie Bouzková
  Caroline Dolehide
  Anna Zaja
  Renata Zarazúa

The following player received entry by a special exempt:
  Melanie Oudin

The following player received entry by a protected ranking:
  Michelle Larcher de Brito

Champions

Singles

 Mandy Minella def.  Verónica Cepede Royg, 6–4, 7–5

Doubles

 Michaëlla Krajicek /  Maria Sanchez def.  Elise Mertens /  Mandy Minella, 6–2, 6–4

External links 
 2016 Coleman Vision Tennis Championships at ITFtennis.com
 Official website

2016 ITF Women's Circuit
2016 in American tennis
Tennis tournaments in the United States
Tennis in New Mexico